Maximilian Krah (born January 28, 1977) is a German lawyer and politician who is serving as an Alternative for Germany Member of the European Parliament.

Biography
Krah grew up in Upper Lusatia as the youngest of three children. His mother was a teacher and his father Peter Krah was an engineer, an executive for the local chapter of the Christian Democratic Union and later an advisor to the Ministry for Interior and Sports of Lower Saxony. After high school, Krah studied law at the Technical University of Dresden followed by an MBA at the London Business School and the Columbia Business School in New York. In 2004 he completed state examinations to practice as a lawyer and was called to the bar in 2005. He also ran a law firm in Dresden with two colleagues.

Krah lives in Dresden. He is a practicing Catholic, is widowed and has seven children.

Political career
Krah joined the Junge Union in 1991, the youth wing of the CDU. During his studies he was also active in the Association of Christian Democratic Students. Krah left the CDU in 2016. In that same year, Krah joined Alternative for Germany and was elected deputy chairman of the AfD Saxony in February 2018.

In 2019, Krah was elected as an MEP for the AfD. In the European Parliament he sits as a member of the Identity and Democracy group and is a member of the committees for Relations with the United States, International Trade (INTA) and Deputy Member of the Delegation to the Euronest Parliamentary Assembly. He also served as the spokesman for the AfD in the European Parliament until 2022.

Krah ran for the election in June 2022 for mayor of Dresden but lost to incumbent mayor Dirk Hilbert.

References

Living people
MEPs for Germany 2019–2024
Alternative for Germany MEPs
1977 births